Thomas or Tom Carey may refer to:

Thomas Carey (Australian politician) (1830s–1884), Australian politician and surveyor
Thomas Carey (baritone) (1931–2002), American opera singer
Thomas Carey (cricketer) (1903–1966), American-born Irish cricketer and British colonial administrator
Thomas Carey (English politician) (died 1634), second son of the 1st Earl of Monmouth, English Member of Parliament
Thomas Godfrey Carey (1895–1902), Guernsey politician
Tom Carey (footballer) (1941–2009), Australian rules footballer 
Tom Carey (shortstop) (1846–1906), 19th century baseball player
Tom Carey (second baseman) (1906–1970), MLB infielder
Tom Carey (rugby league), Australian rugby league player
Tom Carey (NASCAR), NASCAR truck driver in 2000 NASCAR Craftsman Truck Series
Tom Carey, actor in Man in the Mirror: The Michael Jackson Story

See also
Thomas Cary (disambiguation)
Thomas Kerry (disambiguation)